Rebecca Clare Fitzgerald  (born September 1968) is a British medical researcher (born September 1968) whose work focuses on the early detection and treatment of oesophageal cancers. She is a tenured Professor of Cancer Prevention and Program Leader at the Medical Research Council Cancer Unit of the University of Cambridge. In addition to her professorship, Fitzgerald is currently the Director of Medical Studies for Trinity College, Cambridge, where she is also a Fellow. She is also an Honorary Consultant in Gastroenterology and General Medicine at Cambridge's Addenbrooke's Hospital. She is also the co-leader of the CRUK Cambridge Institute Early Detection Programme.

Education 
Fitzgerald received a MA Cantab and a MB BChir in Medicine from Girton College, Cambridge in 1992. In 1997, she completed an MD at Stanford University under the guidance of George Triadafilopoulos.

Career and research
Fitzgerald's postdoctoral work took place at the Department of Adult and Paediatric Gastroenterology at St Bartholomew's Hospital and at The Royal London School of Medicine and Dentistry, where she was supervised by Michael Farthing and funded by an MRC Clinical Scientist award.

After her postdoctoral positions, Fitzgerald began her own research group at the MRC Cancer Unit in Cambridge. In 2004, Fitzgerald and her group developed Cytosponge, a novel screening test for Barrett's oesophagus, a common precursor to the often deadly cancer oesophageal adenocarcinoma. Cytosponge consists of a pill-sized capsule that contains a sponge, and is attached to a string. The capsule is swallowed, which expands into a sponge in the stomach. The sponge is then pulled out by the string, collecting cells from the oesophageal wall along the way. Subsequent biological analysis of the collected cells determines whether a patient has Barrett's. Cytosponge has been praised for its minimally invasive, economical design compared to the current standard for identifying Barrett's oesophagus, the endoscopy. The procedure has completed its third clinical trial, which saw it tested on 9,000 patients in the UK. The results of the BEST3 trial were published in The Lancet in summer 2020 showing that the Cytosponge-TFF3 test can identify ten times more people with Barrett's oesophagus than current GP care.

Fitzgerald has contributed to the public dialogue regarding cancer research, having appeared on broadcasts for BBC Radio 4 and ABC Radio Australia.

Fitzgerald is leading a new trial in collaboration with Owlstone Medical that will be testing the company's Breath Biopsy technology for detecting cancer. Because early cancer symptoms can be quite vague, new technologies are needed to try and pin-point the signals that will lead to a diagnosis. This pilot study will capture and examine the volatile molecules found in breath in the hopes of identifying signatures of metabolites from cancer cells. The team hopes to collect samples from 1,500 individuals by 2021 and will compare signatures from people with different types of cancer to healthy individuals.

Honours and awards
In recognition of her work on Cytosponge and the early treatment of Barrett's oesophagus, Fitzgerald was awarded the Westminster Medal in 2004. In 2008, she was the recipient of a Lister Prize Fellowship, and in 2008 she received an NHS Innovation Prize. In 2013, Fitzgerald won a Research Professorship at the National Institute for Health Research (NIHR) for her work.

The Royal College of Physicians appointed Fitzgerald as its Goulstonian Lecturer. She was also awarded the British Society of Gastroenterology's Sir Francis Avery Jones Award. In 2013, Fitzgerald was elected as a Fellow of the Academy of Medical Sciences. Fitzgerald has also won a grant from the Evelyn Trust “as she works to develop effective screening that will benefit patients worldwide.”. In 2018, Fitzgerald was awarded the Jane Wardle Prevention and Early Diagnosis prize, which recognises individuals who have produced world-leading research in the field of prevention and early detection of cancer.

Fitzgerald was appointed Officer of the Order of the British Empire (OBE) in the 2022 Birthday Honours for services to cancer research.

References

1968 births
Living people
21st-century women scientists
20th-century British medical doctors
21st-century British medical doctors
British women medical doctors
NIHR Research Professors
Stanford University School of Medicine alumni
Fellows of Trinity College, Cambridge
Officers of the Order of the British Empire
British gastroenterologists
British oncologists